Ictidostoma is an extinct genus of non-mammalian synapsids known from the Tropidostoma Assemblage Zone.

See also

 List of therapsids

References

 The main groups of non-mammalian synapsids at Mikko's Phylogeny Archive

Eutherocephalians
Therocephalia genera
Prehistoric synapsids of Africa
Fossil taxa described in 1931
Taxa named by Robert Broom